Before photosynthesis evolved, Earth's atmosphere had no free oxygen (O2). Small quantities of oxygen were released by geological and biological processes, but did not build up in the atmosphere due to reactions with reducing minerals. 

Oxygen began building up in the atmosphere at approximately 1.85 Ga. At current rates of primary production, today's concentration of oxygen could be produced by photosynthetic organisms in 2,000 years. In the absence of plants, the rate of oxygen production by photosynthesis was slower in the Precambrian, and the concentrations of O2 attained were less than 10% of today's and probably fluctuated greatly.

The increase in oxygen concentrations had wide ranging and significant impacts on life. Most significantly, the rise of oxygen caused a mass extinction of anaerobic microbes and paved the way for multicellular life.

Before the Great Oxidation Event 
Photosynthetic prokaryotic organisms that produced O2 as a waste product lived long before the first build-up of free oxygen in the atmosphere, perhaps as early as 3.5 billion years ago. The oxygen they produced would have been rapidly removed from the oceans by weathering of reducing minerals, most notably iron. This rusting led to the deposition of iron oxide on the ocean floor, forming banded iron formations. Thus, the oceans rusted and turned red. Oxygen only began to persist in the atmosphere in small quantities about 50 million years before the start of the Great Oxygenation Event.

Effects on life

Early fluctuations in oxygen concentration had little direct effect on life, with mass extinctions not observed until around the start of the Cambrian period, . The presence of  provided life with new opportunities. Aerobic metabolism is more efficient than anaerobic pathways, and the presence of oxygen created new possibilities for life to explore. Since the start of the Cambrian period, atmospheric oxygen concentrations have fluctuated between 15% and 35% of atmospheric volume. The maximum of 35% was reached towards the end of the Carboniferous period (about 300 million years ago), a peak which may have contributed to the large size of various arthropods, including insects, millipedes and scorpions. Whilst human activities, such as the burning of fossil fuels, affect relative carbon dioxide concentrations, their effect on the much larger concentration of oxygen is less significant.

The Great Oxygenation Event had the first major effect on the course of evolution. Due to the rapid buildup of oxygen in the atmosphere, many organisms that didn't rely on oxygen to live died.
The concentration of oxygen in the atmosphere is often cited as a possible contributor to large-scale evolutionary phenomena, such as the Avalon explosion, the Cambrian explosion, trends in animal body size, and other diversification and extinction events.

Data show an increase in biovolume soon after the Great Oxygenation Event by more than 100-fold and a moderate correlation between atmospheric oxygen and maximum body size later in the geological record. The large size of many arthropods in the Carboniferous period, when the oxygen concentration in the atmosphere reached 35%, has been attributed to the limiting role of diffusion in these organisms' metabolism. But Haldane's essay points out that it would only apply to insects. However, the biological basis for this correlation is not firm, and many lines of evidence show that oxygen concentration is not size-limiting in modern insects. Ecological constraints can better explain the diminutive size of post-Carboniferous dragonflies - for instance, the appearance of flying competitors such as pterosaurs, birds and bats. 

Rising oxygen concentrations have been cited as one of several drivers for evolutionary diversification, although the physiological arguments behind such arguments are questionable, and a consistent pattern between oxygen concentrations and the rate of evolution is not clearly evident. The most celebrated link between oxygen and evolution occurs at the end of the last of the Snowball Earth glaciations, where complex multicellular life is first found in the fossil record. Under low oxygen concentrations and before the evolution of nitrogen fixation, biologically-available nitrogen compounds were in limited supply and periodic "nitrogen crises" could render the ocean inhospitable to life. Significant concentrations of oxygen were just one of the prerequisites for the evolution of complex life. Models based on uniformitarian principles (i.e. extrapolating present-day ocean dynamics into deep time) suggest that such a concentration was only reached immediately before metazoa first appeared in the fossil record. Further, anoxic or otherwise chemically "inhospitable" oceanic conditions that resemble those supposed to inhibit macroscopic life re-occur at intervals through the early Cambrian, and also in the late Cretaceous – with no apparent effect on lifeforms at these times. This might suggest that the geochemical signatures found in ocean sediments reflect the atmosphere in a different way before the Cambrian - perhaps as a result of the fundamentally different mode of nutrient cycling in the absence of planktivory.

An oxygen-rich atmosphere can release phosphorus and iron from rock, by weathering, and these elements then become available for sustenance of new species whose metabolisms require these elements as oxides.

References

External links
 
 
 ; 

Biogeochemistry
Geological history of Earth
Oxygen